Five Branded Women is a 1960 Italian-American film directed by Martin Ritt (his only war film) and produced by Dino De Laurentiis. It features an international cast including Silvana Mangano, Barbara Bel Geddes, Jeanne Moreau and Vera Miles. The film is set during the Nazi occupation of Yugoslavia and was shot in Italy and Klagenfurt, Austria.`

Plot
Five Yugoslavian women are accused of consorting with the Nazis who have taken over their town. The women are banished from the town and meet up with guerillas in the mountains.

Cast

See also
 List of American films of 1960

References

External links

1960 films
Italian war drama films
Films about capital punishment
Films directed by Martin Ritt
Paramount Pictures films
Films with screenplays by Ugo Pirro
1960s war drama films
Films with screenplays by Michael Wilson (writer)
War films set in Partisan Yugoslavia
Films produced by Dino De Laurentiis
American war drama films
Films scored by Angelo Francesco Lavagnino
1960 drama films
Fictional Yugoslav Partisans
English-language Italian films
1960s English-language films
1960s American films
1960s Italian films